Stiracolpus symmetricus, common name : the small turret, is a species of sea snail, a marine gastropod mollusk in the family Turritellidae.

Description
The shell grows to a length of 11 mm.

Distribution
This marine species is endemic to New Zealand.

References

  Beu A.G. (2010) Marine Mollusca of isotope stages of the last 2 million years in New Zealand. Part 3. Gastropoda (Vetigastropoda – Littorinimorpha). Journal of the Royal Society of New Zealand 40(3): 59–180; p.  93

External links
 
  Beu, A. (2010). Marine Mollusca of isotope stages of the last 2 million years in New Zealand. Part 3. Gastropoda (Vetigastropoda – Littorinimorpha). Journal of the Royal Society of New Zealand. 40(3–4): 59–180

Turritellidae
Gastropods of New Zealand
Gastropods described in 1873